Flight 371 may refer to:

Allegheny Airlines Flight 371, crashed on 1 December 1959
TAROM Flight 371, crashed on 31 March 1995

0371